Pierre de Corneillan (died 24 August 1355) was the Grand Prior of Saint-Gilles and 4th Grand Master of the Order of St. John of Jerusalem, in Rhodes, from 1353 to 1355. His Blazon was : "Gules on a bend argent three Cornish choughs sable"

De Corneillan spent most of his brief rule (18 months) successfully  resisting the intentions of Pope Innocent VI, who planned to move the seat of the Order from Rhodes, to somewhere even closer to Palestine and the Mamluk possessions. His marble sarcophagus is preserved at the main hall of the Archaeological Museum of Rhodes.

References

Jean-Christian Poutiers, "Rhodes et ses Chevaliers, 1306-1523", Imprimerie Catholique, ahmed gayre 1989
Lt. Col. G. R. Gayre of Gaure and Nigg., "The Heraldry of the Knights of St. John", India 1956
Vangelis Pavlidis, "Rhodes 1306 - 1522, a Story", Kasseris Publications, Rhodes 1999

Grand Masters of the Knights Hospitaller
Year of birth missing
1355 deaths
Rhodes under the Knights Hospitaller
14th-century French people